Lothar Gaa (30 March 1931 – 16 May 2022) was a German politician. A member of the Christian Democratic Union of Germany, he served in the Landtag of Baden-Württemberg from 1968 to 1984. He died on 16 May 2022 at the age of 91.

References

1931 births
2022 deaths
20th-century German politicians
21st-century German politicians
20th-century German lawyers
German city councillors
Christian Democratic Union of Germany politicians
Members of the Landtag of Baden-Württemberg
Heidelberg University alumni
University of Freiburg alumni
People from Rhein-Neckar-Kreis
Commanders Crosses of the Order of Merit of the Federal Republic of Germany
Recipients of the Order of Merit of Baden-Württemberg